Gorji Mahalleh (also Romanized as Gorjī Maḩalleh) lit. translation; "Georgian quarter", is a village in Kuhestan Rural District, in the Central District of Behshahr County, Mazandaran Province, Iran. At the 2006 census, its population was 5,953, in 1,553 families.
The residents of this village are originally from Georgia after Shah Abbas I obliged several of their ancestors to migrate to this place as defenders against othomons and russians. Gorji means Georgian in Persian pronunciation and Gorji mahalleh means the place that georgian people live. The people of Gorji mahalleh are known for being great musicians.

The Festival of Colors

References 

Populated places in Behshahr County